Otari Ionovich Arshba (born 12 April 1955) is a Russian politician and member of the State Duma of the Russian Federation from 2003. He is a member of the Supreme Council of the United Russia Party.

Arshba was born in Sukhumi in the Abkhaz ASSR. He is a former entrepreneur, top manager. Dollar multimillionaire. Retired FSB Colonel, a veteran of the security services.

In 1989–1991, Arshba stood at the origins of Abkhazian statehood in modern times, serving as an advisor and organizer of political activities in the Soviet parliament of the USSR people's deputy, the future fighter for the independence of the republic, the first president of Abkhazia Vladislav Ardzinba. In 1992–1993, during the Georgian-Abkhazian conflict, Arshba was one of the main financial sponsors of strengthening the defense capability of Abkhazia.

References 

Living people
Russian people of Abkhazian descent
1955 births
United Russia politicians
21st-century Russian politicians
Fourth convocation members of the State Duma (Russian Federation)
Fifth convocation members of the State Duma (Russian Federation)
Sixth convocation members of the State Duma (Russian Federation)
Seventh convocation members of the State Duma (Russian Federation)
Eighth convocation members of the State Duma (Russian Federation)